Gitega Airport  was an airport serving the city of Gitega, the current capital of Burundi (and capital of the Gitega Province). The airport was on a low ridge in the northwest section of the city.

The Gitega non-directional beacon (Ident: GI) is located on the field.

See also

Transport in Burundi
List of airports in Burundi

References

External links
OpenStreetMap - Gitega
FallingRain - Gitega Airport

Buildings and structures in Gitega